Simone Missick (née Cook; born January 19, 1982) is an American film and television actress. She is best known for her role in the Marvel Cinematic Universe as Detective Misty Knight in Luke Cage, a role she also plays in The Defenders and Iron Fist. Since 2019, she starred as Lola Carmichael in All Rise.

Early life
Simone Missick graduated from Renaissance High School in Detroit, Michigan, in 1999 and completed her studies at Howard University in 2003.

Career 
Missick took master classes at British American Drama Academy in England.  There she studied under Ben Kingsley, Alan Rickman, and Jane Lapotaire.

In 2008, Missick was featured in female leading role of Reese Knight in the independent feature The Road to Sundance.

In 2012, Missick played the role of Elise in the television film A Taste of Romance.

In 2014, Missick appeared in the series Ray Donovan as Porschla.

In 2016, Missick had her breakout role on Luke Cage as Misty Knight. Missick reprised the role in The Defenders and in the second season of Iron Fist.

In February 2019, it was announced that Missick was cast in the main role of Trepp for the second season of the Netflix science-fiction series Altered Carbon.

In May 2019, it was announced that Missick was cast in a lead role as Judge Lola Carmichael, a Los Angeles County Superior Court judge for the CBS drama series All Rise.

Personal life 
Missick married actor Dorian Missick in February 2012. He starred alongside her in the second season of Luke Cage as Dontrell "Cockroach" Hamilton.

Filmography

Film/Movie

Television

Awards and nominations

References

External links 
 

Living people
Actresses from Detroit
African-American actresses
American film actresses
American television actresses
21st-century American actresses
Howard University alumni
1982 births
Theatre World Award winners
Renaissance High School alumni
21st-century African-American women
21st-century African-American people
20th-century African-American people
20th-century African-American women